The Gebe cuscus (Phalanger alexandrae) is a species of marsupial in the family Phalangeridae. It is endemic to the island of Gebe, North Maluku province, Indonesia, where it lives at elevations from sea level to 300 m.

It is named after the Australian anthropologist Alexandra Szalay.

References

Possums
Mammals of Indonesia
Mammals described in 1995
Taxonomy articles created by Polbot